Krivda is a surname. Notable people with the surname include:

Ernie Krivda (born 1945), American jazz saxophone player
Rick Krivda (born 1970), American baseball player